Bishop Jurij Bizjak (born 22 February 1947) is a Slovenian Roman Catholic prelate who serves as a Bishop of the Diocese of Koper since 26 May 2012. Previously he was a Titular Bishop of Gergis and Auxiliary Bishop of Diocese of Koper from 13 May 2000 until 26 May 2012.

Education
Bishop Bizjak was born as the eldest son into a Roman Catholic family with four children in the present day Municipality of Ajdovščina in the Slovenian Littoral region.

After finishing primary school, which he attended in his native Col (1953–1958) and Ajdovščina (1958–1961), Jurij graduated a Minor Seminary in Vipava with the secondary education in 1965 and was admitted to the Major Theological Seminary in Ljubljana and in the same time joined the Theological Faculty at the University of Ljubljana, where he studied from 1965 until 1972 and was ordained as priest on June 29, 1971, while completing his philosophical and theological studies. In the meantime, during 1966–1967, he also served his compulsory military service in the Yugoslavian Army.

Pastoral and educational works
After his ordination Fr. Bizjak was engaged in the pastoral work and served as priest in Sežana, Ilirska Bistrica and Planina nad Ajdovščino from 1971 until 1976, when he continued his postgraduate studies at the Pontifical Biblical Institute in Rome, Italy with a bachelor's degree in the camp of a biblical theology in 1979, and after – at the Pontifical Urbaniana University with a Doctor of Theology degree in 1983.

After completing his studies in Rome, he was appointed spiritual director at the Minor Seminary in Vipava and lecturer in biblical sciences at the Theological Faculty of the University of Ljubljana. He was appointed an assistant professor at the Faculty of Theology at the end of 1985, and an assistant professor at the beginning of 1998. During 1990–1991 he studied in Jerusalem and after returning continued to work as professor, parish priest and spiritual director at the Major Theological Seminary in Ljubljana.

Prelate
On May 13, 2000, he was appointed by Pope John Paul II as the a Titular Bishop of Gergis and Auxiliary Bishop of the Diocese of Koper. On July 5, 2000, he was consecrated as bishop by Bishop of Koper Metod Pirih and other prelates of the Roman Catholic Church in the Cathedral of the Assumption of the Blessed Virgin Mary in Koper.

After retirement of his predecessor on May 26, 2012, he became the Diocesan Bishop of Koper.

References

1947 births
Living people
People from the Municipality of Ajdovščina
University of Ljubljana alumni
Pontifical Biblical Institute alumni
Pontifical Urban University alumni
Academic staff of the University of Ljubljana
21st-century Roman Catholic bishops in Slovenia
21st-century Slovenian Roman Catholic priests
Bishops appointed by Pope John Paul II